Daniel Holgado Miralles (born 27 April 2005) is a Spanish Grand Prix motorcycle racer who currently competes for Red Bull KTM Ajo in the Moto3 World Championship. He previously competed in the FIM CEV Moto3 Junior World Championship in 2021 with the Aspar Junior Team, where he won the championship.

Career

Junior career 
Holgado won the 2021 FIM CEV Moto3 Junior World Championship with the Aspar Junior Team with 208 points. Also in 2021, he also made his Moto3 debut at the 2021 Catalan motorcycle Grand Prix, replacing Maximilian Kofler due to a fractured vertebrae. Later in the season, he was hired by Red Bull KTM Tech3 for the Emilia Romagna and the Algarve Grands Prix, replacing Deniz Öncü who was banned for two races for causing an incident involving multiple riders at the Grand Prix of the Americas.

Red Bull KTM Ajo (2022) 
In the 2022 season, Holgado was originally scheduled to make his full season debut with Red Bull KTM Tech3, teaming up with Öncü. However, it was subsequently announced that Holgado would returned Red Bull KTM Ajo instead, where he would team up with Jaume Masià.

Red Bull KTM Tech3 (2023) 
Holgado will compete for the Red Bull KTM Tech3.

Career statistics

Grand Prix motorcycle racing

By season

By class

Races by year
(key) (Races in bold indicate pole position; races in italics indicate fastest lap)

References

External links
 

2005 births
Living people
Sportspeople from Alicante
Spanish motorcycle racers
Moto3 World Championship riders